Ali Hoseyni (also Romanized as ‘Ālī Ḩoseynī and Ālī Ḩoseynī; also known as Ḩoseyn ‘Alī and Husain ‘Ali) is a village in Baghak Rural District, in the Central District of Tangestan County, Bushehr Province, Iran. At the 2006 census, its population was 1,922, in 393 families.

References 

Populated places in Tangestan County